Slander is a false or malicious claim that may harm someone's reputation.

Slander may also refer to:

 Slander of title, a species of malicious falsehood relating to real estate
 Slander of goods, another species of malicious falsehood 
 Slander (1916 film)
 Slander (1956 film), a 1956 film starring Van Johnson
 Slander: Liberal Lies About the American Right, a 2002 book by Ann Coulter
 Slander (picture), a picture of Sandro Botticelli
 Slander (album), 2011 album by Dr. Acula
 Slander (DJs), an American DJ duo from Los Angeles, California
Slander, a Canadian rapper who became famous in 2015 with his debut album Livin’ Da Dream

See also 
 
 
 For the discouraged action of editing Wikipedia articles to maliciously portray people negatively, see Wikipedia:Slander.